Hans-Peter Mayer (born 5 May 1944, in Riedlingen) is a German politician who served as a Member of the European Parliament for Lower Saxony from 1999 until 2014. He is a member of the conservative Christian Democratic Union, part of the European People's Party.

During his time in parliament, Mayer sat on the European Parliament's Committee on Legal Affairs and was a member of the ACP-EU Joint Parliamentary Assembly. He was also a substitute for the Committee on Agriculture and Rural Development and the Delegation to the EU-Former Yugoslav Republic of Macedonia Joint Parliamentary Committee.

Education
 1975: Second state law examination
 Dr.jur
 1975: utr
 1990: PhD

Career
 since 1975: lawyer
 1980-1990: professor of law and administration
 1990-1991: rector of the Catholic Vocational College of North Germany
 1991-1994: under-secretary in the Ministry of Economic Affairs and Technology, Saxony-Anhalt
 1975-1980: municipal councillor in Bad Waldsee
 1984-1991: chairman of Vechta district of Europa Union
 1995-1999: land chairman of the economic council of the CDU of Saxony-Anhalt and the Federal Commission on European policy
 since 1995: chairman of the land specialist committee of the CDU of Oldenburg on development of the Weser-Ems region.
 1999-2014: Member of the European Parliament

See also
 2004 European Parliament election in Germany

External links
 

1944 births
Living people
People from Riedlingen
People from the Free People's State of Württemberg
MEPs for Germany 2004–2009
Christian Democratic Union of Germany MEPs
MEPs for Germany 1999–2004
MEPs for Germany 2009–2014